ScotRail was a train operating company in Scotland owned by National Express that operated the ScotRail franchise from March 1997 until October 2004. Prior to March 1997 ScotRail (British Rail) ran the trains and after October 2004 First ScotRail ran them.

Services
ScotRail operated all passenger train services in Scotland, with the exception of the Arriva Trains Northern, GNER, Virgin CrossCountry and Virgin Trains West Coast services from England. ScotRail operated services into England with services to Carlisle and Newcastle, and the Caledonian Sleeper services between Scotland and London.

Rolling stock
ScotRail inherited a fleet of Class 101, Class 117 Class 150, Class 156, Class 158, Class 303, Class 305, Class 314, Class 318 and Class 320s from British Rail as well as Mark 2 carriages and Mark 3 sleepers for use on the Caledonian Sleepers and on some other passenger services.

ScotRail contracted English Welsh & Scottish to haul the Caledonian Sleeper services to London Euston. Class 90s were used south of Edinburgh and Glasgow Central with Class 37s used on the portion to Fort William and Class 47s to Aberdeen and Inverness.

Depots
ScotRail's fleet was maintained at Haymarket, Glasgow Shields Road and Inverness depots.

Demise
In July 2003, the Scottish Executive and the Strategic Rail Authority announced Arriva, FirstGroup and National Express had been shortlisted to bid for the new franchise. In June 2004, the franchise was awarded to FirstGroup, with the services operated by ScotRail transferring to First ScotRail on 17 October 2004.

References

External links

Defunct train operating companies
National Express companies
Railway companies established in 1997
Railway companies disestablished in 2004
Railway companies of Scotland
Rail transport in Scotland
1997 establishments in Scotland
2004 disestablishments in Scotland
British companies established in 1997
British companies disestablished in 2004